Beauty's Rival in Palace (Chinese: 美人心計, pinyin: Měirén Xīnjì, lit. Schemes of a Beauty) is a 2010 Chinese television series adapted from Xiao Qiying's short story Turbulence in the Empress' Chamber. It was first broadcast on Shanghai TV Drama on 15 March 2010. The series was one of the highest-rated Chinese TV series in 2010.

Set in Chang'an, China during the beginnings of the Han Dynasty, Beauty's Rival in Palace tells a dramatised account of Empress Dou (Ruby Lin) and how her efforts and achievements in the imperial court positively influenced the reign of her husband Emperor Wen (Sammul Chan), which paved the way for the creation of the Rule of Wen and Jing.

Synopsis
During the early Han Dynasty, young Du YunXi's mother was drawn into a palace conflict which resulted in her entire family being executed. When she grew up, she unexpectedly entered the palace as a maid. She displayed extraordinary talents when she arranged for Lady Li's child to be swapped under the care of the empress. Her intelligence impressed Empress Dowager Lü, and she was sent to Liu Heng, King of Dai, with a new identity as Dou Yifang, so she could spy on him.

In order to rid the world of further sufferings under the regime, but at the same time earn the trust of Empress Dowager Lü, Dou Yifang suggested to her husband Liu Heng to start training his army under the guise of building his grand ceremonial tomb. People, believing that she was bringing downfall to the empire, pleaded for her to be put to death. But nonetheless, Liu Heng trusted her completely and subsequently made her his empress.

Lurking in Dai 
At the beginning of Western Han Dynasty, young YunXi and Shen'er fates intertwined as YunXi's mother, a palace maid of Consort Bo embroiled in the schemes of the then Empress Lü Zhi, who was very jealous of her mistress. To cover up a botched assassination of the young Liu Heng, Lü Zhi placed the blame on YunXi's mother and wanted her entire family executed. Consort Bo, knowing that her servant was innocent, plans for the poor maid's escape but the road that was supposed to lead them to freedom was surrounded by Lü Zhi's guards who were under the order to kill YunXi and her Mother. At the hour of peril, Shen'er's father futilely helped YunXi's mother to escape entrapment but they ultimately sacrificed themselves to save their children after being surrounded by the palace guards. YunXi and Shen'er became orphans and they became close as sisters, but were soon separated from each other as YunXi's uncle abandoned Shen'er on the streets at the suggestion of his wife. Lost in the streets, a brothel proprietor took Shen'er and groomed her to be a courtesan.

After growing up, YunXi was selected as a maid-in-waiting in the Han Palace, and Shen'er also went to the palace in the name of another person and met YunXi accidentally. YunXi knows the rules of palace very well – living in palace is just like diving into the treacherous sea. She always behaves carefully and resolves crisis with her wisdom, which helped her gain trust from the Queen (Zhang Yan) and the Emperor (Liu Ying). Zhang Yan was the niece of Liu Ying and the daughter of Princess Yuan of Lu. Shen'er used a lot of tricks to gain favor from the Emperor (Liu Ying), but does not get what she wants. This led to the start of rivalry between YunXi and Shen'er. Empress Dowager Lü Zhi appreciates YunXi's intelligence. She uses Shen'er's life to threaten and force YunXi to change her name to Dou Yifang and become a spy in Dai, monitoring the behaviors of the King of Dai (Liu Heng) and Empress Dowager of Dai (Consort Bo).

The person who escorted Dou Yifang to Dai is Zhou Yafu, a General of Dai, and her maid, Mo Xueyuan, who is also Lü Zhi's spy. In Zhou Yafu's mind, Yifang cannot be trusted; in Yifang's mind, Xueyuan is attending at her side to monitored her on behalf of Lü Zhi.  This causes all of them to distrust each other. In the end, Mo Xue yuan became Yi Fang good sister and someone whom she trusted because she realises Xue Yuan was Ah Chou, an ugly chambermaid that she knew before she became Lü Zhi spy. After arriving at Dai, Yifang finds that the King of Dai (Liu Heng) behaves frivolously and dissolutely, however, the truth is that he is a King who really cares about his people. Thus, she changes her mind and decides to help Liu Heng by sending fake information to Empress Lü Zhi. Liu Heng was also attracted to Yifang, and made a promise that he would never ask why to Yifang because he trusted her.

Consign by the Princess of Dai 
In the past, the mother of Liu Heng (King of Dai), Consort Bo, mutilated her face in order to show her loyalty to Empress Lü Zhi. She was scarred in her face. She lives in the palace of Dai and rarely goes out, with the intent to hide their abilities and pretending to be weak. In her mind, the only wife of Liu Heng and daughter-in-law of hers is Zhou Zirang, the younger sister of Zhou Yafu, a kind and righteous women. Yunxi and Zirang came to Dai together with the rest of the ladies-in-waiting sent from the Han Palace by Lü Zhi as gifts to Liu Heng. Consort Bo viewed the ladies in mistrust especially Yifang as they are the people sent by Lü Zhi.

Qingning, the wife of Liu Heng and the Queen of Dai is actually the spy sent by Lü Zhi to monitor the situations in Dai Palace. However, Qingning fell in love with Liu Heng at first sight, and sent fake information to protect Liu Heng. Unfortunately, Qingning eventually died to protect Yifang's secret identity and extracts a promise from her to take care of Liu Heng. Starting from that moment, Yifang opens her heart to Liu Heng and Liu Heng also falls in love with her. However, Dowager Bo who favored Zirang have her crowned as the Queen of Dai in place of the late Qingning. But the battle in the Palace of Dai intensifies as the ladies fought against each other for Liu Heng's attention especially against Yifang who won his heart. With this and coupled with the disgust from Consort Bo who thinks she is a calamity by being too wise for a woman, made Dou Yifang's life in Dai Palace restless and hounded with troubles.

Against all odds, with the trust and concern from Liu Heng, she goes through difficulties and triumphs over plots and schemes. Sensing the unrest following the assumed death of Liu Ying, Liu Heng wishes to raise arms and troops but was troubled about how to do so without alarming Lü Zhi. Yifang helps her husband on the matters of military training in secret by suggesting him to order for the building of the Royal Mausoleum to achieve immortality, which in turn tricks Empress Lü Zhi into believing that she has led Liu Heng stray, therefore rendering him as harmless. This led the ministers of Dai to think that she was a bad woman, and requested Liu Heng to sentence her to death. Yifang concedes with the negative impressions she made to the ministers and carried on to let them flourish to make her plans to deceive Lü Zhi realistic. Only Liu Heng understands her and respects her for her sacrifices.

Later, through the efforts of Consort Bo, Queen Zirang got pregnant and gave birth to a son prematurely, and asked Dou Yifang to bring up her son before she dies. Years later, Dou Yifang also gave birth to Princess Guantao and Prince Liu Qi. Dou Yifang treated the three children fairly, as a mother do to their children. However, Zirang's child was murdered by Zisu, a maid of Dai whom Consort Bo used to distract Liu Heng from Yifang albeit unsuccessful (Zisu is indebted to Yifang so she tries to pay the debt by removing the obstacle to the crown for Yifang's son, Liu Qi). Everyone thought that it was Dou Yifang who murdered Zirang's child, and Consort Bo hated her to death. Dou Yifang used this unfortunate incident as a balance between Empress Lü Zhi and Dai, and helped Liu Heng to save time to plot insurrection.

Battle in the palace 
Emperor Liu Ying is looking for a way to escape his depressing life in the palace and to the free life out of the control of Empress Dowager Lü. Shen'er helped him to sneak out of the palace by paying a talented impersonator to disguise Liu Ying, However, Shen'er and Liu Ying were caught by Empress Dowager Lü Zhi. Liu Ying tells Lü Zhi about his wish. Lü Zhi eventually gives him freedom and announced to the public that Liu Ying died. Shen'er, who was hungry for fame and power, declined to follow Liu Heng, and was then promoted as Furen by the Empress, not knowing the consequences that will follow. After announcing Liu Ying's death, Lü Zhi enthroned Liu Gong, the son of Liu Ying and Zhang Yan (in truth, the son of the Emperor Liu Ying with concubine Lady Li) as the new emperor, and all the concubines of Liu Ying were immolated.

To escape this coming doom, Shen'er finds ways to get close to the nephew of Empress Dowager Lü Zhi, Lü Lu and escapes from being buried alive in respect to the late Emperor Liu Ying's death. Shen'er is a woman who wishes to be as powerful as the Empress Dowager and she is overwhelmed by the temptation of wealth and power – being obsessed with this kind of thinking and she never stopped finding ways to fulfill her own ambitions. In one of her efforts to seek power, she advised Lü Lu to begin to carry favor in order to be the Royal Grand Commandant. After her plans worked and Lü Lu become the Grand Commandant, in a turn of fate she was captured by Empress Dowager Lü after being caught ill-advising Lü Lu and being a bad influence to young Emperor Liu Gong. Later in order to save herself, Shen'er unwisely told the young Emperor about his parentage and how Lü Zhi executed his birth mother to give a son to Empress Zhang Yan. She asks Lü Lu to use the troops to arrest Lü Zhi and Liu Gong, and plans to build a new emperor. Liu Heng and Liu Zhang team up; Lü Zhi died with regret; Lü Lu and Shen'er escaped in disarray. Wang Zhi, daughter of Shen'er and Lü Lu, was taken away by Mo Li.

At the end of the war, Liu Heng and Liu Zhang were fighting for the throne, Dou Yifang helped Liu Heng to win the heart of people. She use Liu Zhang's wife Lü Yu as a bait, and helped Liu Heng get the throne.

After becoming the Empress, Dou Yifang finds where Shen'er is and lets her live in the Palace of Han. Shen'er went on to play the role of a repentant and caring younger sister to Yifang, but in fact, at every step, she wants to be the Empress. Shen'er deliberately designs plans to let Liu Heng favor and patronize her in order to sleep with him, and she gives birth to his second son, Liu Wu.

Under the instructions of the Prime Minister, Dou Changjun posed as Dou Yifang's lost brother to spy on her and expose her identity. Instead of exposing him, she bought his allegiance immediately and used him as a double-agent to infiltrate the political scene. He eventually falls in love with her. They become soul mates and he helped her go through her darkest hours when she and Liu Heng were at a cold war with each other for two years.

For her son's future, Shen'er views Yifang's son, Liu Qi as an obstacle in her son's path to the Throne. Shen'er plotted and devised schemes to overthrow Yifang. Initially, she plans to reveal Yifang's relationship to the late Empress Lü Zhi as a spy sent to Dai. She also uses Zhou Yafu's hatred towards Yifang due to the death of Zirang's son and further plans the rape and murder of Xueyuan to enlist Zhou Yafu in her conspiracy against Yifang, and allying herself in secret with Empress Dowager Bo who held grudges against Yifang. Later, she devises the witchcraft affair by planting voodoo dolls with Liu Heng and Liu Wu's name on it in Yifang's palace in order to charge Yifang with treason crime of praying for Liu Heng and Liu Wu's death. But YiFang changed the name Liu Wu to Liu Qi and planted it back in Shen'er's palace. In the end, her own plot backfires against herself and Shen'er's doomed fate was sealed. For her son's life, Shen'er makes a deal with Yifang, that she will confess the criminal charges resulting from her schemes and in return, Yifang must protect her son's life – to this which Yifang agrees.

Hostility between mother and son 
In an accident, Liu Qi killed the King of Wu's youngest son Liu Xian, a spoiled lording that antagonized Liu Qi. Liu Bi, the King Of Wu seeks to have his son's death avenged and pressured the Emperor to execute Liu Qi. The court is in a difficult conflict as Liu Bi's Wu State is the frontier region of the Han Empire – in case Liu Bu rises in rebellion against the Han Court for this matter, the whole empire will be in disarray as they will lose a protector region against foreign invaders. Yifang wisely maneuvered through the conflict by staking Liu Qi's life to pressure Liu Bi to accept his son's death as an accident. Although Yifang managed to save the Empire from falling apart, her son grows apart from her- believing that he has no place in Yifang's heart. The disheartened, gradually alienated Liu Qi then secretly met Wang Zhi, his childhood acquaintance and was deeply attracted to her. Liu Heng was ill but often wakes up at night to care for Yifang during her blindness. Liu Heng does his best to hide his illness, so as to not cause Yifang to worry. Finally, at the moment of their final parting, Liu Heng told Yi Fang that he has no regrets in life and he loves her with all his heart.  Liu Heng died in the summer of the year 157 BC and afterwards, Liu Qi ascended the Throne as Emperor Jing of Han.

However, Yifang, now Empress Dowager deeply loved Shen’er's only son Liu Wu, and out of fear of harm that might come to him, she tried to pressure Liu Qi to appoint his brother as Crown Prince, to which Liu Qi agreed to let his brother ascend the throne after a hundred years. Sensing the turbulence in palace and wanting to secure their position, Consort Wang Zhi and Princess Guantao forged an alliance, in which the latter promised to help Liu Che ascend the Throne, but Liu Che must marry her daughter, Chen Jiao and crown her Empress afterward.

Liu Qi attempted to consolidate the power of the Crown by trying to subdivide the individual Kingdoms into smaller regions or states. The Kings of those kingdoms did not consent to have their powers weakened, and went to war with the Empire – which was famously known as the Rebellion of Seven States. Zhou Yafu was dispatched by the Emperor to defeat the rebellion and bring back peace to the Empire. In one of decisive moment of the war, Zhou Yafu was surrounded and required reinforcements from Liu Wu's Kingdom of Liang which turned the tide of war back to their favor.

After the war, Liu Wu was commended lavishly for his contributions to the war effort, and slowly he grew arrogant and vain. He started building palaces, and using titles reserved for the emperor, including preparing an Emperor's gown for himself. When Liu Qi told Yifang of this, she allowed him to punish him in whichever way he deems fit, but as long as he spares Liu Wu's life. However Liu Wu was subsequently assassinated – Liu Qi reported that he was mugged and murdered. Yifang was greatly distressed, and she accused him of killing Prince Wu.

Liu Qi, already frail in health, coupled with physical exertion on the court affairs, was soon terminally ill. As he is dying, Liu Qi wanted to see his mother again, but holding grudges towards Liu Wu’s death, Yi Fang refused to meet him. Then, Liu Qi commanded that he must be carried to the door of the Empress Dowager’s chamber, and still Yi Fang refused to see him. Liu Qi called upon Yifang in a tender voice, as a longing son calls to his long-departed mother. Eventually, his heartfelt speech slowly reaches Yifang’s heart. With tears in their eyes, both mother and son hugged tightly and in Liu Qi’s last breath, reconciled the hostilities between them.

Succession intrigues 
After Liu Heng died, Liu Qi ascended the Throne as Emperor Jing of Han and he favored Wang Zhi, although the Grand Empress Dowager Bo set her grandniece, Empress Bo to be his royal wife. The court is worried along with the royal palace of Han as Empress Bo still has not given birth to a son and not to mention her losing the Emperor's favors. Consort Wang Zhi gives birth to a son named Liu Che, while another consort called Li gives birth to the oldest son of the Emperor, Liu Rong. Liu Che in his childhood showed wisdom and intelligence, which prompted the attention and love of Liu Qi to Empress Bo and Consort Li’s dismay.

Because Empress Bo did not have a son, Emperor Jing created his and Consort Li's oldest son, Liu Rong as Crown Prince. Wanting to eliminate potential rival to her son's position, Consort Li manipulated Empress Bo into trying to kill Consort Wang. In the end, Consort Li's scheme is discovered and as a result, Prince Rong's title was stripped and both of them were exiled. Emperor Jing later appoint Consort Wang's son, Liu Che as Crown Prince.

The end of one's era 
Emperor Jing died in 141 BC and was succeeded by Liu Che who become Emperor Wu of Han, while Yifang became the Grand Empress Dowager. During the Lantern Festival celebration day, Liu Che and Chen Jiao were arguing in their royal chambers. The palace maids informed the Grand Empress Dowager and she rushed to mediate their conflict but she overheard Chen Jiao say that her mother, Princess Guantao arranged assassins to kill Liu Wu secretly for Liu Che, so that the latter's path to the throne will be easier. Listening to this, Yi Fang collapsed in sadness and began to cry, lamenting that all her family members are doing nothing but harming each other and she had misunderstood Liu Qi.

Finally, in the last scene, old Yifang, together with Empress Dowager Wang Zhi and Zhou Yafu, were reminiscing the past, when a group of young girls who just entered the palace as maiden-in-waiting are presented to Yifang and one of them is Wei Zifu, the future Empress Wei, the wife of Emperor Wu. Yifang gives them a bit of advice to "take in the past because in the future, you'll regret not taking in the tears and happiness". Yifang's days of scheming are over, as Wei Zifu's days are just starting. They also informed that Dou Yifang died and was buried with Liu Heng.

Cast
 Ruby Lin as Du Yunxi / Dou Yifang / Tian Xianglian
 Lin Miaoke as young Du Yunxi
 Sammul Chan as Liu Heng
 Yang Mi as Mo Xueyuan
 Wang Likun as Nie Shen'er / Nie Ao / Wang Zhi / Concubine Qi
 Jiang Yiyi as young Nie Shen'er / young Wang Zhi
 Mickey He as Zhou Yafu
 Myolie Wu as Lü Yu
 Dai Chunrong as Lü Zhi
 Bai Shan as Consort Bo
 Feng Shaofeng as Liu Zhang
 Luo Jin as Liu Ying / Dou Changjun
 Mu Qing as young Liu Ying
 Gao Hao as Liu Qi
 Ma Ruihao as young Liu Qi
 Gao Yang as Bo Qiaohui
 Deng Sha as Lady Li
 Zhang Tong as Shen Bijun
 Su Qing as Zhang Yan
 Dong Hui as young Zhang Yan
 Du Junze as Lü Lu
 Sun Feifei as Qingning
 Qu Yue as Zisu
 Tammy Chen as Beauty Li
 Yan Kuan as Liu Shaokang
 Huang Haibing as Nie Feng
 Frankie Lam as Jin Wangsun
 Miao Luoyi as Xiang Moyu
 Zhou Muyin as Zhou Ziran
 Tian Zitian as Yu Jinse
 Han Junzi as Jiang Si
 Gong Mi as Chen Jiao
 Li Xingchen as young Chen Jiao
Zhang Meng as Wei Zifu
 Zhang Xiaochen as Liu Wu
 Li Sha as Moli
 Lü Jiarong as Princess Luyuan
 Qi Wei as Princess Guantao
 Zhang Xueying as young Princess Guantao
 Deng Xibin as Wang Yuan
 Lee Yiu-king as Tian Daye
 Ge Ziming as Tian Guochun
 Duan Junhao as Ma Lu
 Li Qinqin as Jin Zhi
 Chen Shidan as Princess Pingyang
 Mao Zijun as Liu Che

Production
Due to its large and diverse cast as well as expensive set and costume production, the series attracted international attention during its production stages. Another reason is due to the popularity of lead actress Ruby Lin in countries like South Korea and Japan.

The series was primary filmed in Wuxi, Wuhan, and Hengdian World Studios. It has a production budget of ¥50 million (US$7.3 million), and employed the special effects team from Hollywood. Other notable cast members include the stunt choreography team from Zhang Yimou's Hero and music composers of Red River Valley.

Soundtrack

Reception
The series is one of the highest rated series of 2010 and received viewership of more than 19 million when it was first aired on Shanghai TV Drama. It was also the first VOD premiere in China, with 270,000 concurrent users watching.

There were some reports lately saying that Beauty's Rival in Palace based its plot from TVB's Beyond the Realm of Conscience. The director denied this, claimed the first draft of the script for the series was released when Beyond the Realm of Conscience was still in its scriptwriting stage.

Awards and nominations
5th Seoul International Drama Award (South Korea)
 Won: Most Popular Actress – Ruby Lin (tied)
 Nominated : Most Popular Actor – Sammul Chan

2011 YOUKU Entertainment Award
 Won : Best TV series of the year
 Won : Most Popular TV Actress – Ruby Lin
 Won : Best Actress (Hong Kong & Taiwan) – Ruby Lin

QQ Annual Entertainment Star Award
 Won : Most Popular Actress – Ruby Lin

2011 China TV Drama Awards
 Won : Top 10 Television Series (#7)

2010 China TV Drama Awards
 Won :Most Popular Actress (Hong Kong & Taiwan) – Ruby Lin

2011 4th DAN Movie Awards (Vietnam)
 Won : Favorite Drama (China)
 Won : Favorite Actress (Taiwan & Singapore) – Ruby Lin
 Won : Favorite Actor (Hong Kong) – Sammul Chan
 Won : Favorite Couple – Ruby Lin & Sammul Chan
 Nominated : Favorite OST – "Luo Hua" by Ruby Lin
 Nominated : Favorite Character (China) – Dou Yifang (portrayed by Ruby Lin)

2012 Huading Awards
 Nominated : Best Actress – Ruby Lin

International broadcast
 Far East

 Arab world
 كيد النساء (Kid Al Nissae) – Distributed by Middle East Media

 Latin America
 Belleza y Rivalidad en el Palacio – Distributed by Latin Media Corporation

References

External links
  Beauty's Rival in Palace official page on Sina.com
  Beauty's Rival in Palace on QQ entertainment
  Beauty's Rival in Palace Korean official site at Zhong Hua TV

Television series set in the Western Han dynasty
Chinese historical television series
2010 Chinese television series debuts
2010 Chinese television series endings
Television shows based on Chinese novels
Television shows written by Yu Zheng
Mass media in Shanghai
Television series by Huanyu Film